A bursa (or burse), from Greek βύρσα ("hide", "skin", "bag"), is a parament about twelve inches square in which the folded corporal is kept in for reasons of reverence. It is used in the liturgy of the Roman Catholic Church and the Lutheran churches. Until the reform of the Second Vatican Council, the bursa was carried by the priest to the altar when he entered for Holy Mass. It was placed upon the chalice at the beginning and end of the Mass and on the altar at benediction.

Usually, the bursa was made from two pieces of cardboard which were bound together at three edges; the forth was open to receive the corporal. The outer side of the bursa has the same liturgical color of the day and occasionally the same ornamentation as the vestments. The inner side is made of linen or silk. A cross or the nomen sacrum IHS may be embroidered on the top. The two halves of the bursa are sewn together on one side and tied with ties or gussets on two sides to prevent the corporal from falling out.

References 

Christian religious objects
Eucharistic objects